is a passenger railway station in the city of Tondabayashi, Osaka Prefecture, Japan, operated by the private railway company Nankai Electric Railway.

Lines
Takidani Station is served by the Nankai Kōya Line, and is located 24.6 kilometers from the terminus of the line at Shiomibashi Station and 23.9 kilometers from Namba Station.

Station layout
The station consists of two opposed side platforms connected to the station building by a footbridge. The station is unattended.

Platforms

Adjacent stations

History
Takidani Station opened on March 29,1898. The Nankai Railway was merged into the Kintetsu group in 1944 by orders of the Japanese government, and reemerged as the Nankai Railway Company in 1947.

Passenger statistics
In fiscal 2019, the station was used by an average of 5292 passengers daily

Surrounding area
 Kawachinagano Matsugaoka Post Office

See also
List of railway stations in Japan

References

External links

 Takidani Station  

Railway stations in Japan opened in 1898
Railway stations in Osaka Prefecture
Tondabayashi, Osaka